Micarea is a genus of lichenized fungi in the family Pilocarpaceae. The widely distributed genus contains 126 species and new species are described actively. Species in the genus are crustose lichens and their photobiont (the non-fungal organism) is a single-celled green alga.

Taxonomy
Micarea was circumscribed by Elias Magnus Fries in his 1825 work Systema Orbis Vegetabilis. There have been some taxonomic disputes about the genus. Nowadays, the genus is accepted, although it is paraphyletic and in need of further research. Micarea prasina is the type species of the genus.

Reproduction
Lichenized fungi have developed diverse reproduction strategies. The microlichen genus Micarea is an excellent model for studying the effects of reproductive traits and environmental factors on speciation because it shows intricate variation in substrate requirements and reproduction modes. Certain Micarea species are generalists and able to grow on various substrata, while some are specialized and live in strict microhabitats. Some of the Micarea species are predominately sexual, while some frequently lack sexual structures but bear numerous pycnidia where asexual conidia are produced. The actual roles of the three types of conidia present are not thoroughly understood, but mesoconidia are likely asexual propagules based on, for example, the observation that many of the species are frequently found with only mesopycnidia and no apothecia. Recent phylogenetic analyses together with ancestral state reconstruction among Micarea species showed that the shift in reproduction mode has evolved independently several times within the group and that facultative and obligate lignicoles are sister species. This supports the assumption that the ancestor of these species was a facultative lignicole. It is presumed that a shift in substrate requirement from bark to wood leads to differentiation in reproduction mode and becomes a driver of speciation in Micarea microlichens. The case of Micarea is the first observation that among lichenized fungi reproduction mode is connected to substrate requirement. It is also the first example where such an association is demonstrated to lead to lichen speciation. The main hypothesis behind this phenomenon is that obligate species on dead wood need to colonize new suitable substrata relatively fast and asexual reproduction is a more effective strategy for successful colonisation.

Species
, Species Fungorum accepts 126 species of Micarea, although this tally does not yet include some recently described taxa, such as four species from montane cloud forests of Kenya.

Micarea adnata 
Micarea aeruginoprasina 
Micarea alabastrites 
Micarea alectorialica 
Micarea argopsinosa 
Micarea assimilata 
Micarea austroternaria  – Australia
Micarea azorica 
Micarea bacidiella 
Micarea bebourensis 
Micarea borbonica 
Micarea boryana 
Micarea botryoides 
Micarea byssacea 
Micarea canariensis 
Micarea capitata 
Micarea ceracea  – Australasia
Micarea cilaosensis 
Micarea cinerea 
Micarea cinereopallida  – Australasia; South America
Micarea contexta 
Micarea coppinsii 
Micarea corallothallina 
Micarea coreana 
Micarea curvata 
Micarea czarnotae 
Micarea deminuta 
Micarea denigrata 
Micarea doliiformis 
Micarea elachista 
Micarea eucalypti 
Micarea eximia 
Micarea fallax 
Micarea farinosa 
Micarea fennica 
Micarea flagellispora  – Australasia
Micarea flavoleprosa 
Micarea globulosella 
Micarea granuloblastidiata  – Panama
Micarea hedlundii 
Micarea herbarum  – Europe
Micarea humilis  – Australia
Micarea hyalinoxanthonica 
Micarea hylocomii 
Micarea hypoviolascens 
Micarea incrassata 
Micarea inquinans 
Micarea intersociella 
Micarea isabellina  – Australia
Micarea isidioprasina 
Micarea isidiosa 
Micarea kartana  – Australia
Micarea kemmleri 
Micarea laeta 
Micarea lapillicola 
Micarea leprosula 
Micarea levicula 
Micarea lignaria 
Micarea lithinella 
Micarea magellanica 
Micarea marginata 
Micarea melaena 
Micarea melaenida 
Micarea melanobola 
Micarea melanoprasina 
Micarea meridionalis  – Europe
Micarea microareolata 
Micarea micrococca 
Micarea micromelaena  – Australasia
Micarea microsorediata 
Micarea minuta  – western Europe
Micarea misella 
Micarea mutabilis  – Australia
Micarea myriocarpa 
Micarea neostipitata  – eastern North America
Micarea nigella 
Micarea nigra 
Micarea nigrata 
Micarea nitschkeana 
Micarea nowakii 
Micarea olivacea 
Micarea oreina  – Australasia
Micarea pallida  – Australasia
Micarea pannarica 
Micarea paratropa 
Micarea parva 
Micarea pauli 
Micarea peliocarpa 
Micarea poliocheila 
Micarea polycarpella 
Micarea prasina 
Micarea prasinastra  – Australasia
Micarea prasinella 
Micarea pseudocoppinsii 
Micarea pseudolignaria 
Micarea pseudomarginata 
Micarea pseudomicrococca 
Micarea pseudotsugae  – western Europe
Micarea pumila  – Kenya
Micarea pusilla 
Micarea pycnidiophora 
Micarea rubiginosa  – Australasia; South America
Micarea sandyana  – Australasia
Micarea saxicola  – Australasia
Micarea senecionis 
Micarea sipmanii 
Micarea soralifera 
Micarea squamulosa 
Micarea stellaris  – Kenya
Micarea stereocaulorum 
Micarea stipitata 
Micarea subalpina 
Micarea subcinerea 
Micarea subconfusa 
Micarea subgranulans 
Micarea sublithinella 
Micarea submilliaria 
Micarea subnigrata 
Micarea subternaria 
Micarea subviridescens 
Micarea synotheoides 
Micarea taitensis  – Kenya
Micarea takamakae 
Micarea tenuispora 
Micarea termitophila 
Micarea ternaria 
Micarea tomentosa 
Micarea tubaeformis  – Australasia
Micarea turfosa 
Micarea usneae  – Madeira
Micarea versicolor  – Kenya
Micarea viridiatra  – Europe
Micarea viridicapitata  – Mexico
Micarea viridileprosa  – western Europe
Micarea vulpinaris 
Micarea xanthonica  – Europe; North America

References

Pilocarpaceae
Lichen genera
Lecanorales genera
Taxa named by Elias Magnus Fries
Taxa described in 1825